Université Laval is a public research university in Quebec City, Quebec, Canada. The university was founded by royal charter issued by Queen Victoria in 1852, with roots in the founding of the Séminaire de Québec in 1663 by François de Montmorency-Laval, making it the oldest centre of higher education in Canada and the first North American institution to offer higher education in French. The university, which was founded in Old Québec, moved to a new campus in the 1950s in the suburban borough of Sainte-Foy–Sillery–Cap-Rouge. It is ranked among the top 10 Canadian universities in research funding and holds four Canada Excellence Research Chairs. Like most institutions in Québec, the name "Université Laval" is not translated into English.

History
 

The university's beginnings go back to 1663 with the founding of the Grand Séminaire de Québec and 1668 with the founding of the Petit Séminaire by François de Montmorency-Laval, a member of the House of Laval and the first Bishop of New France.

During the French Regime the institution mainly trained priests to serve in New France. After the Conquest of 1760, the British expanded education in Canada to include the liberal arts. French Canadians had at the time no opportunity to pursue higher education, and Bishop Bourget of Montreal suggested expanding the Séminaire de Québec into Université Laval. Louis Casault, a priest who taught physics at the Séminaire de Québec, went to Europe to seek a royal charter and study the best university systems there.

The Séminaire de Québec was granted a royal charter on December 8, 1852, by Queen Victoria, at the request of Lord Elgin (Governor-General of the Province of Canada), creating Université Laval with "the rights and privileges of a university". The charter was signed in 1852. Pope Benedict XV approved the plan and authorized the institution to establish chairs of theology and confer degrees.

In 1878, the university opened a second campus in Montreal, which became the Université de Montréal on May 8, 1919, by a writ of Pope Benedict XV. In 1971, a second charter transferred all authority to the Université Laval council.

By 1925, the university had outgrown its location. The Old City was very crowded, making it difficult to add new buildings to the campus. The university moved to Sainte-Foy in the 1950s, which at the time was a semi-rural community west of the Quebec city centre. The School of Architecture returned to the old building (now affectionately referred to as Le Vieux Séminaire) in 1989.

Université Laval is governed by a board of governors and a faculty senate. This structure was modelled on the provincial University of Toronto Act of 1906, which established a bicameral system of university government consisting of a senate (faculty), responsible for academic policy, and a board of governors (citizens) exercising exclusive control over financial policy and having formal authority in all other matters. The president, appointed by the board, was to serve as a link between the two bodies and lead the institution.

In the early part of the 20th century, the need for higher education expanded beyond the classical fields of theology, law and medicine, and the university introduced science and social-science departments such as forestry and household science. In addition, graduate training based on the German-inspired American model of specialized course work and the completion of a research thesis was introduced.

"Laval", a waltz by French-Canadian ragtime composer, Wilfrid Beaudry, was dedicated to the students at Laval University and the University of Montreal. The music for piano was published in Quebec by J. Beaudry, circa 1906.

In 1929, the Quebec Seminary was designated as a national historic site of Canada.

The university opened its department of social, political, and economic sciences in 1938, signalling a change of approach that continued into the 1960s, based on an idea of higher education as the key to social justice and economic productivity for individuals and society.

The royal charter that founded Université Laval in 1852 was designated a National Historic Event in 1972.

This location, at 1 Rempart Street, Quebec, still continues operation as a centre for educating Roman Catholic priests. A section of the Vieux Séminaire has been the location for the Université's school of architecture since 1987. The Camille-Roy pavilion houses the restored Promotions Room which can be rented as a venue for various types of events.

In 2017, the university became the first in Canada to divest its endowment from fossil fuel-related companies.

Buildings and features
After it was granted a university charter, several buildings were built in Old Quebec, including the School of Chemistry (1923), the addition on Ste. Famille Street (1931), the Mining School (1938), and the cafeteria building (1945), all by architect Joseph Simeon Bergeron. However, the neighbourhood was already crowded and activities later moved in nearby Sainte-Foy, which was more spacious.

Campus building
Its earliest buildings and landscapes were designed by Edouard Fiset (fr) from the 1950s, and of its lands, 56 percent are wooded areas, grasslands, and sports fields .

Other infrastructure
The campus is also home to the Roger-Van den Hende botanical garden (fr) which contains some 67 species of deciduous and coniferous trees and 60 different species of birds. The Louis-Jacques-Casault building also hosts the regional branch of the National Archives of Quebec. The sport building is called PEPS and is said to be the largest sport complex in eastern Canada. It is adjacent to the covered TELUS stadium. Construction for the Telus stadium started in 2010 and was opened to the public in January 2012 (fr).

Off campus
Apart from the school of architecture, located in Old Quebec since 1988, the only out of campus facilities are the school of visual arts in the downtown neighbourhood of Saint-Roch's, and the experimental Montmorency forest (fr) ( north of Quebec City).

Programs
As of 2002, Université Laval offered over 350 programs to more than 38,000 students. The university also attracts more than 2,500 foreign students annually, and has almost 1,000 students drawn from Canadian provinces outside of Quebec. Many students come to the university for the Français pour non-francophones program that offers instruction in French as a second language to students from Canada and around the world. It is also the only university in Quebec which trains forestry engineers. Since the mid-1980s, Université Laval has offered distance learning; over 30 programs and 400 courses are offered by distance learning, of which 80% are accessible from the internet.

Faculties and schools

Research
Université Laval holds four of the 19 Canada Excellence Research Chairs awarded nationwide: Canada Excellence Research Chair in Remote Sensing of Canada's New Arctic Frontier, Canada Research Excellence Chair in the Microbiome-Endocannabinoidome Axis in Metabolic Health, Canada Excellence Research Chair in Photonic Innovations, and Communication and Canada Excellence Research Chair in Neurophotonics. The university has also received research funding from Huawei but has kept the details of the funding confidential.

University press
Les Presses de l'Université Laval (University Press), which was founded in 1950, deals with Canadian civilization, literature, medieval studies, law, social sciences, physical sciences and engineering.  It publishes some 120 books per year.

University cooperative

The Coopérative de l'Université Laval (University Co-op) is engaged in the sale of products to customers throughout the university, such as books, lecture notes and computers. They have two locations. One is on campus in the administrative building and the other near La Fabrique, the Arts building in Old Québec.

Athletics and sports teams

Athletics take place at the Pavillon d'éducation physique et des sports (Physical Education and Sports Complex), in short PEPS. Laval's varsity sports teams are named the Rouge-et-Or (Red & Gold). As of 2020, the men's football team of Laval have won 10 Vanier Cups and has thus the most titles in the country, followed by the Western Mustangs (8 Vanier Cups).

Notable people

Public figures, including Prime Ministers of Canada, Premiers of Quebec, Supreme Court Justices, federal Cabinet Ministers, Senators, and Lieutenant-Governors as well as national and international athletes have graduated from l'Université Laval. Some of the more prominent are:
 Prime Ministers of Canada: Louis St. Laurent, Brian Mulroney and Jean Chrétien
 Premiers of Quebec: Lucien Bouchard, Pierre-Joseph-Olivier Chauveau, Edmund James Flynn, Jean Lesage, René Lévesque, Pauline Marois, Simon-Napoléon Parent and Louis-Alexandre Taschereau
 Supreme Court Justices: Suzanne Côté, Louis LeBel, Claire L'Heureux-Dubé, Charles Fitzpatrick, Arthur Cyrille Albert Malouin, Lawrence Arthur Dumoulin Cannon, Louis-Philippe Pigeon, Julien Chouinard, Robert Taschereau, Henri-Elzéar Taschereau, Thibaudeau Rinfret

See also

 List of universities in Quebec
 List of universities in Canada
 Group of Thirteen (Canadian universities)
 Laval Thomism
 List of oldest universities by region
 Quebec City
 Canadian university scientific research organizations
 Higher education in Quebec
 CHYZ campus radio station
 Medicago Inc.

References

External links

 
 Bibliothèque de l'Université Laval
 Université Laval Foundation
 Faculty of Forestry, Geography and Geomatics
 
 

 
1663 establishments in the French colonial empire
1852 establishments in Canada
Education in Quebec City
Educational institutions established in the 1660s
Forestry education
Universities in Quebec
Laval